River Bank in Fog (German - Flussufer im Nebel) is a c. 1821 oil on canvas painting by Caspar David Friedrich, now in the Wallraf-Richartz-Museum & Fondation Corboud in Cologne, for which it was acquired in 1942 from the Graf Hahn collection at Schloss Basedow (Mecklenburg). It is also known as Elbschiff in Early Fog (Elbschiff im Frühnebel).

Analysis

Bibliography (in German)
 Werner Hofmann: Das entzweite Jahrhundert, Kunst zwischen 1750 und 1830. Beck, München 1995.
 Rose-Marie und Rainer Hagen: Bildbefragungen. Taschen, Köln 2016.

Contemporary fog paintings by Friedrich

External links (in German)
 Lebenslauf von Caspar David Friedrich bei der Caspar-David-Friedrich-Gesellschaft
 Caspar David Friedrich: Poet der Landschaftsmalerei beim Norddeutschen Rundfunk
 Flussufer im Nebel bei www.wikiart.org
 Ausstellung im Wallraf-Richartz-Museum mit dem Gemälde

References

1821 paintings
Collections of the Wallraf–Richartz Museum
Paintings by Caspar David Friedrich